Euphorbia heleniana or French grass or Saint Helena spurge is a herbaceous plant, a member of the Euphorbiaceae family.

Distribution 
It is an endemic species to Saint Helena.

Taxonomy 
It was named by Albert Thellung and Otto Stapf, in Bull. Misc. Inform. Kew 1916: 201 in 1916.

References

External links 

heleniana